A zombie star is a hypothetical result of a Type Iax supernova which leaves behind a remnant star, rather than completely dispersing the stellar mass. Type Iax supernovae are similar to Type Ia, but have a lower ejection velocity and lower luminosity. Type Iax supernovae may occur at a rate between 5 and 30 percent of the Ia supernova rate. Thirty supernovae have been identified in this category.

In a binary system consisting of a white dwarf and a companion star, the white dwarf strips away material from its companion. Normally the white dwarf would eventually reach a critical mass, and fusion reactions would make it explode and completely dissipate it, but in a Type Iax supernova, only half of the dwarf's mass is lost.

Observed instances
Supernova SN 2012Z in the NGC 1309 galaxy is thought to be of type Iax, and was discovered by S.B. Cenko, W. Li, and A.V. Filippenko using the Katzman Automatic Imaging Telescope on 2012 January 29.15 UT as part of a supernova search at Lick Observatory.

The proposed formation scenario for SN 2012Z is that the original system at the heart of the supernova was a binary pair of large, but otherwise ordinary main sequence stars. The more massive of the binary stars lost substantial amounts of its hydrogen and helium to its smaller companion, and became a white dwarf. The newly engorged companion star then evolved into an enlarged stage, whose outer layers engulfed the white dwarf. The outer hydrogen layers of the overlapping stars were then ejected, leaving behind a still-active helium core and the white dwarf. In turn, the white dwarf drained back some matter from the remaining companion star, until the white dwarf became so unstable that it exploded as a supernova, with the former helium core left behind as a remnant zombie star.

There were images of the area from before the supernova, allowing before and after images, and the process of the supernova to be studied. To test the zombie star hypothesis, the area was observed again a few years after the event. The authors found that the decline of the light curve was consistent with the existence of a radioactively-heated bound remnant, but that it was difficult to come up with a model that could explain the whole light curve.

This discovery is a milestone in a decades long search by astronomers for such an occurrence; the observation of SN 2012Z was the first time astrophysicists were able to identify a star system that later went supernova.

SN 2008ha may be a type Iax supernova, but significantly weaker than SN 2012Z.

References

Supernovae
Supernova remnants
Hypothetical astronomical objects